Hammarström is a Swedish surname. Notable people with the surname include:

Hanna Hammarström (1829–1909), Swedish inventor and businesswoman
Harald Hammarström (born 1977), Swedish linguist
Inge Hammarström (born 1948), Swedish ice hockey player
Johan Hammarström (born 1967), Swedish footballer
Klara Hammarström (born 2000), Swedish singer
Kristin Hammarström (born 1982), Swedish footballer
Louise Hammarström (1849–1917), Swedish chemist
Marie Hammarström (born 1982), Swedish footballer
Nanny Hammarström (1870–1953), Finnish author
Peter Hammarström (born 1969), Swedish ice hockey player
Rune Hammarström (1920–1999), Swedish speed skater
Torsten Hammarström (1896–1965), Swedish diplomat

Swedish-language surnames